The 2022 New Mexico Commissioner of Public Lands election will take place on November 8, 2022, to elect the next New Mexico Commissioner of Public Lands. Incumbent Democratic Land Commissioner Stephanie Garcia Richard is seeking re-election.

Democratic primary

Candidates

Nominee
Stephanie Garcia Richard, incumbent land commissioner

Results

Republican primary

Candidates

Nominee
Jefferson Byrd, member of the New Mexico Public Regulation Commission (2019–present) and environmental engineer

Results

Independents

Candidates

Declared
Larry Marker (write-in), former oil and gas operator

General election

Polling

Results

Notes

References

External links
Official campaign websites
Stephanie Garcia Richard (D) for Land Commissioner
Jefferson Byrd (R) for Land Commissioner

Commissioner of Public Lands